Cambrian is a neighborhood of San Jose, California, located in West San Jose. Though most of the neighborhood is incorporated as part of San Jose, a small portion exists as an unincorporated census-designated place called Cambrian Park.

History

The name "Cambrian Park" was used regularly since the 1950s by the then San Jose Mercury and San Jose News newspapers (now The San Jose Mercury News) to refer to a portion of the Union school and Cambrian school areas, the latter school named in the 1870s by ranch hand David Lewis of the Jeremiah D. Casey Ranch for Cambria, the Latinized name for Wales (Welsh, Cymru), the country of Lewis's birth. Due to the relative isolation of adjacent population centers within then rural Santa Clara County, place names and later, municipalities, were often defined by their public school service boundaries. These indistinct boundaries persisted until WWII, after which a rapidly expanding population and demand for municipal services resulted in more precise boundaries being established. The Cambrian Park area continues to be recognized as a distinct, partly unincorporated neighborhood bordering the cities of San Jose and Campbell and the town of Los Gatos.

We and Our Neighbors women's club was established in the adjacent Union School District area in 1892, "...to promote social ties, intellectual and cultural pursuits, charitable deeds, and recreation for the farm families of the neighborhood." Their clubhouse, built in 1910, is a San Jose Historic Landmark and appears in the National Register of Historic Places.

The commerce center for the Cambrian Park area has always been the Cambrian Park Plaza.  Located at the crossroads of Camden and Union Avenues, the center was originally built in 1953.  Today the center maintains the country charm and construction style, across over 170,000 square feet of stores.  Through the years, the center has housed a mix of local shops and national brands.  The iconic colorful carousel atop the center sign is a historical landmark. This is of particular interest in the community as the center was sold for the first time ever in 2015, to Texas-based Weingarten Realty.

Geography

Cambrian Park is located at  (37.255593, −121.928915).

Cambrian is located in the South San Jose region of the city. Willow Glen is to its north, Los Gatos is to its south and west, Campbell is to its northwest, and Almaden is to its east.

Most of Cambrian lies within San Jose's city limits, though a small portion is an unincorporated county pocket. A large swath of the pocket was annexed by the City of Campbell in 2012, under an agreement with the City of San Jose, while the rest will eventually be annexed by San Jose.

Demographics
These figures do not include any part of Cambrian Park which has been incorporated into San Jose at the time of the census.

2010

The 2010 United States Census reported that Cambrian Park had a population of 3,282. The racial makeup of Cambrian Park was 2,598 (79.2%) White, 26 (0.8%) African American, 29 (0.9%) Native American, 221 (6.7%) Asian, 19 (0.6%) Pacific Islander, 190 (5.8%) from other races, and 199 (6.1%) from two or more races. Hispanic or Latino of any race were 591 persons (18.0%).

The Census reported that 3,268 people (99.6% of the population) lived in households, 3 (0.1%) lived in non-institutionalized group quarters, and 11 (0.3%) were institutionalized.

There were 1,141 households, out of which 439 (38.5%) had children under the age of 18 living in them, 670 (58.7%) were opposite-sex married couples living together, 122 (10.7%) had a female householder with no husband present, 67 (5.9%) had a male householder with no wife present.  There were 57 (5.0%) unmarried opposite-sex partnerships, and 10 (0.9%) same-sex married couples or partnerships. 206 households (18.1%) were made up of individuals, and 88 (7.7%) had someone living alone who was 65 years of age or older. The average household size was 2.86.  There were 859 families (75.3% of all households); the average family size was 3.25.

The population was spread out, with 789 people (24.0%) under the age of 18, 231 people (7.0%) aged 18 to 24, 775 people (23.6%) aged 25 to 44, 1,080 people (32.9%) aged 45 to 64, and 407 people (12.4%) who were 65 years of age or older.  The median age was 42.4 years. For every 100 females, there were 101.1 males.  For every 100 females age 18 and over, there were 102.2 males.

The homeowner vacancy rate was 0.8%; the rental vacancy rate was 4.1%.  2,621 people (79.9% of the population) lived in owner-occupied housing units and 647 people (19.7%) lived in rental housing units.

2000

As of the census of 2000, there were 3,258 people, 1,127 households, and 854 families residing in the CDP.  The population density was 2,062.2/km (5,322.0/mi2).  There were 1,143 housing units at an average density of 723.5/km (1,867.1/mi2).  The racial makeup of the CDP was 84.87% White, 0.40% African American, 1.04% Native American, 4.11% Asian, 0.21% Pacific Islander, 4.33% from other races, and 5.03% from two or more races. Hispanic or Latino of any race were 11.63% of the population.

There were 1,127 households, out of which 35.8% had children under the age of 18 living with them, 57.8% were married couples living together, 11.7% had a female householder with no husband present, and 24.2% were non-families. 16.7% of all households were made up of individuals, and 6.7% had someone living alone who was 65 years of age or older.  The average household size was 2.88 and the average family size was 3.20.

In the CDP, the population was spread out, with 25.7% under the age of 18, 7.1% from 18 to 24, 31.9% from 25 to 44, 23.5% from 45 to 64, and 11.8% who were 65 years of age or older.  The median age was 38 years. For every 100 females, there were 101.0 males.  For every 100 females age 18 and over, there were 99.2 males.

The median income for a household in the CDP was $80,743, and the median income for a family was $89,706. Males had a median income of $59,375 versus $46,700 for females. The per capita income for the CDP was $31,942.  About 4.2% of families and 5.6% of the population were below the poverty line, including 3.0% of those under age 18 and 14.1% of those age 65 or over. There have been plans made in 2018 to remodel and modernize the Cambrian Park Plaza. Hundreds of townhouses and apartments, a couple of hotels, a convalescent home, a town square and a small park would mix with stores and shops at the renovated Cambrian Park Plaza shopping center, according to recently unveiled preliminary design plans.

Education
Cambrian is served by the Cambrian School District, which operates elementary and middle schools. For high school, Cambrian is served by the Campbell Union High School District.

Schools in Cambrian include:
 Leigh High School
 Branham High School

References

External links

Cambrian Park branch of the San Jose Public Library system
Cambrian Resident – weekly free community newspaper

Census-designated places in Santa Clara County, California
Neighborhoods in San Jose, California
Census-designated places in California